Rajan Salvi is a Shiv Sena politician from Ratnagiri district, Maharashtra. He is current Member of Legislative Assembly from Rajapur Vidhan Sabha constituency of Konkan, Maharashtra, India as a member of Shiv Sena. He has been elected for three consecutive terms in the Maharashtra Legislative Assembly for 2009, 2014 and 2019.

Positions held
 2009: Elected to Maharashtra Legislative Assembly
 2014: Re-Elected to Maharashtra Legislative Assembly
 2019: Elected to Maharashtra Legislative Assembly

See also
 Ratnagiri–Sindhudurg Lok Sabha constituency
 Raigad Lok Sabha constituency

References

External links
 Shivsena Home Page

Living people
People from Ratnagiri district
Maharashtra MLAs 2009–2014
Maharashtra MLAs 2014–2019
Marathi politicians
Shiv Sena politicians
Year of birth missing (living people)